The 11th Army Corps was an Army corps in the Imperial Russian Army

Before the war the unit was stationed with the Kiev Military District.

Composition (1914)
 11th Infantry Division (Lutsk)
 32nd Infantry Division (Rovno)
 11th Cavalry Division (Dubno)
 11th Mortar Artillery Battalion
 21st Engineering Battalion

Commanders 
 Alexey Ivanovich Shakhovskoy (1876–1879)
 Lieutenant-General Prince Ivan Shakhovskoy, (1888–1892)
 Pavel Grigorievich Dukmasov (1894–1895)
 Dmitrij Petrovich Dohturov (1895–1900)
 Lieutenant General Vladimir Nikolayevich Filipov, (3.03.1900–12.5.1903)
 Lieutenant General Alexandr Yakovlevich Tal (1.07.1903–1905)
 Lieutenant-General (from 6.12.1907 city – General of Infantry) Ivan Aleksandrovich Fullon, (1.06.1905–7.08.1911)
 Lieutenant-General (from 6.12.1912 city – General of Infantry) Nikolai Ivanovich Podvalnyuk, (7.08.1911–13.12.1912)
 General of the cavalry Vladimir Sakharov,  (13.12.1913–22.08.1914, 04.09.1915–25.10.1915)
 Lieutenant-General (from 10.04.1916, General of Artillery) Michael A. Barantsev, (03.11.1915–06.04.1917)
 Lieutenant General Konstantin Lukich Gilchevsky, (06.04.1917 -?)

See also
 List of Imperial Russian Army formations and units

References 

 
 

Corps of the Russian Empire
Military units and formations established in 1914
1914 establishments in the Russian Empire